is a Japanese company that operates , a comparison shopping website, and other services.

About 
The company was established in 1997. It is listed on the Tokyo Stock Exchange. Kakaku.com is Japan’s largest price comparison site. The representative director is Shonosuke Hata and the board chairman is Kaoru Hayashi.

The Kakaku.com website has 52.77 million monthly users and 769.6 million monthly page views as of March 2017.

References

External links
Company website

Companies listed on the Tokyo Stock Exchange
Online marketplaces of Japan
Comparison shopping websites
Mass media companies based in Tokyo
Internet properties established in 1997
Retail companies established in 1997
Japanese companies established in 1997
Internet technology companies of Japan